The 19th NKP Salve Challenger Trophy was a domestic cricket tournament that was held in Indore from 25 September to 28 September 2013. The series involved the domestic teams from India which were India Blue, India Red, and Delhi. The tournament was won by India Blue who defeated Delhi by 50 runs.

This tournament marked the last edition of the NKP Salve Challenger Trophy, after BCCI scrapped the tournament while restructuring their calendar for domestic tournaments for the later upcoming seasons.

Squads

 Earlier, Irfan Pathan was chosen to lead India Red in the tournament, but after he along with Saurabh Tiwary got injured they were replaced by Sandeep Warrier and Ishank Jaggi respectively. Yusuf Pathan was chosen to lead the squad after Irfan Pathan was ruled out.
 Mandeep Singh was replaced by Sibsankar Roy for India Blue after he sustained a finger injury.

Matches

Group stage

Final

References

2013 in cricket